Yek Lengeh-ye Olya (also Romanized as Yek Lengeh-ye ‘Olyā; also known as Yek Lengeh) is a village in Bala Rokh Rural District, Jolgeh Rokh District, Torbat-e Heydarieh County, Razavi Khorasan Province, Iran. At the 2006 census, its population was 570, in 138 families.

References 

Populated places in Torbat-e Heydarieh County